Hazel Grove is a suburb in the Metropolitan Borough of Stockport, Greater Manchester, England, close to the Peak District national park.

Within the boundaries of the historic county of Cheshire, the area was known as Bullock Smithy until 1836.

History

Early history

Hazel Grove is made up of three separate townships: Norbury, Torkington and Bosden-cum-Handforth. Norbury (Nordberie) was mentioned in the Domesday Survey in 1086. Each of the townships were manorial lands. Until the 17th century, the area was known exclusively by each of the respective townships.

In 1560, Richard Bullock built a smithy on the corner of what is now Torkington Park. This building later became the Bullock Smithy Inn and gradually the whole area became known as Bullock Smithy.

Non-conformists
There were no churches in the area until the end of the 16th century. The church consisted of a very basic chapel, without communion. It was a favoured hotbed of the north-east Cheshire Non-conformist movement. After the Restoration in 1662, it was forbidden for ministers to preach without the Book of Common Prayer. The minister of Norbury Chapel, John Jolie, went to preach, but found that the door was locked. He and his followers broke down the door and he preached as usual. Subsequently, he was tried for Non-conformity, but it was decided that Norbury Chapel was not a consecrated place. In 1750, John Wesley preached in Bullock Smithy describing it as "... one of the most famous villages in the county for all manner of wickedness."

Religion

By 1833, the village had grown to over 3,000 people and it was decided the area should have its own parish. In July 1834, the Church of St Thomas was consecrated at Norbury.

Name change
The village elders began to tire of the jokes surrounding the name Bullock Smithy. The Manchester Guardian had carried a humorous story about an auctioneer trying to sell a rare book. No bidders were coming forward, so in an act of encouragement he told the crowd "Come on, where's tha al from? Bullock Smithy? Because tha don't know a book from a brick." In 1835, it was decided that the village would be known as Hazel Grove. The name Hazel Grove had been used in the village previously. An area called Hassel Grave near High Lane appears on a map of 1674 and an area near Poise Brook was locally known as Hazel Grove. The former Grove Inn had been called the Hazel Grove Inn since it opened; however, on 26 September 1836, the name was officially changed.

Governance
The village was part of the civil parish of Norbury, which was included in the Stockport Rural District of Cheshire from 1894 to 1900. From 1900 to 1974, Hazel Grove was part of the Hazel Grove and Bramhall civil parish and urban district. Hazel Grove and Bramhall civil parish was abolished in 1974 and its former area was transferred to Greater Manchester to form part of the Metropolitan Borough of Stockport.

The majority of the suburb lies within the Hazel Grove parliamentary constituency, whose current MP is William Wragg of the Conservatives.  However, the western part of Hazel Grove, including the Stepping Hill ward, lies within the Cheadle parliamentary constituency, whose current MP is Mary Robinson of the Conservatives.

Transport
Notable features of Hazel Grove include the A6 road, a major thoroughfare running from Luton to Carlisle, which passes through the centre of the area. There have been many attempts and plans to build a by-pass for the large amount of heavy traffic which uses the A6 on its way into and around Stockport and south Manchester and, in early 2015, the plans for the by-pass were finalised and put into effect. The by-pass was completed in October 2018.

Hazel Grove is the southern terminus for the 192 bus route, which runs along the A6 to Manchester via Stockport.

The suburb is served by Hazel Grove railway station, which is on the Hope Valley and Buxton lines from Stockport. Hazel Grove (Midland) was situated between the railway overbridges at the south end of the town and was only open from 1902 until 1917.

The local tram services to Stockport, Reddish and Manchester terminated near Norbury Church and the Rising Sun pub until about 1950, when they were replaced by buses and the cobbles on the A6 were covered by tarmac. At the start of the operation of the tram services, Hazel Grove residents were – jokingly – alleged to black-lead the tramlines early in the morning.

Education
Hazel Grove has a number of primary schools and Hazel Grove High School. The main primary schools in the area are: Hazel Grove Primary School, Torkington Primary School, Norbury Hall Primary School and Moorfield Primary School. There are two local Catholic primary schools: St Simon's and St Peter's.

Economy

Most residents work outside the suburb. Hazel Grove is also home to the UK Adidas headquarters, who have their main warehouse on the edge of the suburb, and the nearby Stepping Hill Hospital which is the main maternity and A&E hospital serving the Stockport and south Manchester areas.

Mirlees, Bickerton and Day established a factory in October 1908, where diesel engines were manufactured for many years.

Nexperia (formerly NXP, Philips, Mullard) have a semiconductor manufacturing plant (wafer Fab) off Bramhall Moor Lane in Hazel Grove. The site has been there for over 25 years and currently employs around 650 people. Before that, the site was at School Street, which has an interesting history. Before 1939, the site beside the Marcliff (later Warwick) cinema at the south end of the village had a garage and petrol station (opposite Jack Sharp's greyhound track), which was converted at the outbreak of war into an aircraft factory, occupying the entire triangle between Macclesfield Road and the two railway lines. This seemed also to have been extended behind the Norbury Church, in School Street. At the end of the war, prefabs were built. The Macclesfield Road site was taken over later for pharmaceuticals by British Schering. Eventually, G.E.C. started a transistor factory at the School St address.  Both of these locations are now light industrial estates housing a number of small businesses, some still in the original buildings.

Hazel Grove's high street, London Road, and its surrounding area is the largest district centre in Stockport Borough with a diverse range of small shops and larger supermarkets, public houses, restaurants and takeaways.

Sport and recreation
Speedway racing was staged at the Hazel Grove Greyhound Stadium in 1937, although details of the meetings are sketchy. Greyhound racing meetings were held every Saturday afternoon for many years, until the track was closed around 1960. In the 1970s, part of the site was made into an extension of the local football pitches on Torkington Park for amateur teams to use, until the site was sold and redeveloped; partly as a Carpetright store, partly as the Greyhound Industrial Estate.

Hazel Grove has several recreational centres: Hazel Grove Sports Centre, in the grounds of Hazel Grove High School, Hazel Grove Pools and Target Fitness and Torkington Park which provides crown green bowling, tennis courts and football pitches.

Hazel Grove Snooker Club, on Macclesfield Road, has been a notable centre of national snooker competitions since its establishment in November 1984. Being one of the largest snooker venues in the UK, the club has hosted a substantial number of WPBSA (later WSA) and ESPB competitions throughout the last three decades, leading to two confirmed and referee-verified 147 breaks at the club (Jason Prince in British Open Qualifier, 13 January 1999, and Nick Dyson in UK Tour Event 4, 2 March 1999). The club has also hosted major disability sports events, such as the WDBS Northern Classic 2019 for participants with learning and physical disabilities and the WDBS DS Active Workshop 2019 providing snooker training for players with Down's Syndrome.

There is also a tennis and bowling club on Douglas Road and two cricket clubs, Hazel Grove CC and Norbury CC. The latter includes a lacrosse club and crown green bowling club, each with their own facilities.

Hazel Grove Football Club was founded in 1957 and play their home games at Torkington Park. The club was taken over by new management in 2014 and plays in the Manchester Saturday Morning Football League. Norbury Athletic is a junior football club based opposite the high school on Jacksons Lane.

Notable residents 
 Joan Bakewell, journalist, television presenter and Labour Party peer.
 William Garbutt, the first professional manager in Italian football, was born in Hazel Grove.

See also

Listed buildings in Hazel Grove and Bramhall

References

Notes

Bibliography

External links

Stockport Borough Council
Stockport District Centres

Areas of Greater Manchester
Geography of the Metropolitan Borough of Stockport